Chaudhry Shahbaz Ahmad is a Pakistani politician who was a Member of the Provincial Assembly of the Punjab, from 2008 to May 2018 and from August 2018 till January 2023.

Early life and education
He was born on 14 December 1973 in Lahore.

He graduated from University of the Punjab and has a degree of Bachelor of Arts.

Political career
He was elected to the Provincial Assembly of the Punjab as a candidate of Pakistan Muslim League (Nawaz) (PML-N) from Constituency PP-143 (Lahore-VII) in 2008 Pakistani general election. He received 32,440 votes and defeated Mian Mohammad Bilal Asghar, a candidate of Pakistan Peoples Party (PPP).

He was re-elected to the Provincial Assembly of the Punjab as a candidate of PML-N from Constituency PP-143 (Lahore-VII) in 2013 Pakistani general election. He received 57,919 votes and defeated Mohammad Arshad Khan, a candidate of Pakistan Tehreek-e-Insaf (PTI).

He was re-elected to Provincial Assembly of the Punjab as a candidate of PML-N from Constituency PP-148 (Lahore-V) in 2018 Pakistani general election.

References

Living people
Punjab MPAs 2013–2018
1973 births
Pakistan Muslim League (N) MPAs (Punjab)
Punjab MPAs 2008–2013
Punjab MPAs 2018–2023